Cheru or Choru may refer to:

Burma
 Cheru, Kyauktaga, a former town in Kyauktaga Township, Bago Region, Burma (Myanmar)

Iran
()
 Cheru, Khuzestan
 Choru, Kohgiluyeh and Boyer-Ahmad
 Cheru, Razavi Khorasan